Press Pass, Inc. is a trading card and licensed sports die-cast company that was founded in 1992. Press Pass was the first company to insert a game used jersey into basketball cards, and inserted a race-used tire into their NASCAR trading cards in 1996.

References

Trading cards